"Dead Inside" is a song by English rock band Muse. The opening track on their seventh album, Drones, it was released as the album's lead single and second overall on 23 March 2015. On the same day, a lyric video for the song was released on the band's YouTube channel, while the single premiered on BBC Radio 1.

Background
Placing the song within the album's context, Matthew Bellamy said: "This is where the story of the album begins, where the protagonist loses hope and becomes 'Dead Inside', therefore vulnerable to the dark forces introduced in 'Psycho' and which ensue over the next few songs on the album, before eventually defecting, revolting and overcoming these dark forces later in the story".

Composition
"Dead Inside" is an electronic rock and synth-pop song. Music magazine Rolling Stone described the song as a "relationship horror song" that "sets up the drama on [the band's] new album 'Drones'". According to the article, "Muse turn the tumultuous end of a relationship into a funky pop song on "Dead Inside," the latest track from their upcoming LP, Drones. Frontman Matt Bellamy sings the chorus with his bandmates as a shocking, gang-vocal stinger to bass-heavy verses like, 'I see magic in your eyes/on the outside you're ablaze and alive, but you're dead inside.'" Consequence of Sound critic Collin Brennan also described the track as synth-pop, comparing it to the works of Depeche Mode.

Music video
On 3 April 2015, Muse teased pictures of the filming of the song's music video on their as well as drummer Dominic Howard's Instagram account. On 5 April 2015, both American contemporary dancer Kathryn McCormick and So You Think You Can Dance finalist Will Wingfield were confirmed to feature in the music video for "Dead Inside". The video was released on 28 April 2015, and was directed by Robert Hales.

Track listing

Charts

Weekly charts

Year-end charts

Certifications

References

2015 singles
2014 songs
Muse (band) songs
Songs written by Matt Bellamy
Warner Records singles
Music videos directed by Robert Hales
Synth rock songs
British synth-pop songs